The 2022 Maranhão gubernatorial election will took place in the state of Maranhão, Brazil on 2 October 2022, as part of the 2022 Brazilian general election in the Federal District and the 26 states. Voters will elect a Governor, Vice Governor, one Senator, two Alternate Senators, 18 representatives for the Chamber of Deputies, and 42 Legislative Assembly members. Under the Constitution of Brazil, the governor will be elected for a four-year term starting 1 January 2023 and with the approval of Constitutional Amendment No. 111, it will end on 6 January 2027. If the first place does not reach more than 50% of the valid votes, a second round will be held on 30 October 2022.

The incumbent governor of Maranhão is Carlos Brandão, a member of the Brazilian Socialist Party (PSB), who took office after the resignation of Flávio Dino (PSB) on 2 April 2022. Dino resigned to run for the Federal Senate. For the election to the Federal Senate, the seat occupied by Roberto Rocha (PTB) since 2014, is at dispute, and the incumbent said that he intends to run for re-election.

Electoral calendar

Legislative Assembly 
The result of the last state election and the current situation in the Legislative Assembly of Maranhão is given below:

Gubernatorial candidates 
The party conventions began on 20 July and will continue until 5 August. The following political parties have already confirmed their candidacies. Political parties have until 15 August 2022 to formally register their candidates.

Confirmed candidates

Withdrawn candidates 

 Josimar Maranhãozinho (PL) - Mayor of Maranhãozinho (2005–2012), state deputy of Maranhão (2015–2019) and federal deputy from Maranhão (since 2019). Josimar Cunha Rodrigues withdrew his candidacy on 23 May 2022. He decided to run for re-election to the Chamber of Deputies. After voting with fellow party members, he declared support for Weverton Rocha's candidacy, nominating the running mate on Rocha's ticket.

Senatorial candidates 
The party conventions began on 20 July and will continue until 5 August. The following political parties have already confirmed their candidacies. Political parties have until 15 August 2022 to formally register their candidates.

Confirmed candidates

Opinion polls

Governor

First round 
The first round is scheduled to take place on 2 October 2022.

Second round 
The second round (if necessary) is scheduled to take place on 30 October 2022.

Brandão vs. Weverton

Brandão vs. Lahésio

Brandão vs. Edivaldo

Weverton vs. Edivaldo

Brandão vs. Rocha

Weverton vs. Josimar

Weverton vs. Lahesio

Weverton vs. Rocha

Senator

Notes

References 

Maranhão
2022
2022 elections in Brazil